Yury Dubinin (born 10 September 1976 in Beloretsk) is a male freestyle wrestler from Belarus. He participated in men's freestyle 60 kg at the 2008 Summer Olympics. Dubinin lost to South Korea's Jung Ji-Hyun and did not advance past the first round.

References

External links
 NBC Profile

Living people
1976 births
People from Beloretsk
Sportspeople from Bashkortostan
Olympic wrestlers of Belarus
Wrestlers at the 2008 Summer Olympics
Belarusian male sport wrestlers